Dorothy Wagner Puccinelli, also known as Dorothy Puccinelli Cravath (December 19, 1901 – May 24, 1974), was a New Deal-era artist and muralist. She was based in San Francisco, California.

Biography 
Born as Dorothy Wagner on December 19, 1901, in San Antonio, Texas, at age five her family moved and settling in Half Moon Bay, California. In 1919, she enrolled at the California School of Fine Arts (now known as San Francisco Art Institute) and then continued in 1925 at the Rudolph Schaeffer School of Design in San Francisco to studied with Beniamino Bufano.

Her first marriage was to artist Raymond Puccinelli which ended in divorce. In 1941, Dorothy married Austin Cravath (brother of artist Ruth Cravath) and together they had a daughter named Anne.

In 1937, Puccinelli created a  6′ x 8′ tempera-on-canvas mural called Vacheros at the post office in Merced, California. The mural was funded by the Treasury Section of Fine Arts.

In 1939, Puccinelli worked with artist, Helen Katharine Forbes to paint the interior four panel murals of the Mother's Building at the San Francisco Zoo. The four murals depict a Noah's Ark-theme with animals and were funded by Federal Art Project (FAP) and Works Progress Administration (WPA). From 1978 until 2002, the Mother's Building served as a gift shop for the zoo, the mural is now in need of restoration and the room is only used for special events.

In 1960 and 1975, Puccinelli and Emmy Lou Packard restored murals, including Coit Tower.

References

External links 
 The Bancroft Library and Regional Oral History Office, San Francisco Artists Series Transcript with Dorothy Wagner Puccinelli Cravath and Ruth Cravath from 1977 and 1974

People of the New Deal arts projects
1901 births
1974 deaths
People from San Antonio
People from Half Moon Bay, California
San Francisco Art Institute alumni
Painters from Texas
Painters from California
American women painters
American muralists
20th-century American painters
20th-century American women artists
Women muralists